Knema muscosa is a species of plant in the family Myristicaceae. It is a tree endemic to Borneo where it is confined to Sarawak.

References

muscosa
Endemic flora of Borneo
Trees of Borneo
Flora of Sarawak
Vulnerable plants
Taxonomy articles created by Polbot
Taxa named by James Sinclair (botanist)